The 2002–03 UEFA Cup was the 32nd edition of the UEFA Cup, the second-tier European club football tournament organised by UEFA. The final was played between Portuguese side Porto and Scottish side Celtic at the Estadio Olímpico de Sevilla, Seville, on 21 May 2003. Porto won 3–2 after silver goal extra time and became the first Portuguese team to win the competition.

Feyenoord could not defend their title as they automatically qualified for the 2002–03 UEFA Champions League and were also eliminated from all European competitions after finishing bottom of their group.

Association team allocation
A total of 145 teams from 51 UEFA member associations participated in the 2002–03 UEFA Cup. The association ranking based on the UEFA country coefficients was used to determine the number of participating teams for each association:
Associations 1–6 each had three teams qualified;
Associations 7–8 each had four teams qualified;
Associations 9–15 each had two teams qualified;
Associations 16–21 each had three teams qualified;
Associations 22–49 (except Liechtenstein) each had two teams qualified;
Associations 50–51 each had one team qualified;
Liechtenstein had one team qualified (as it organises only a domestic cup and no domestic league);
The top three associations of the 2001–02 UEFA Respect Fair Play ranking each gained an additional berth;
Moreover, 24 teams eliminated from the 2002–03 UEFA Champions League were transferred to the UEFA Cup.
The winners of the 2001–02 UEFA Cup were given an additional entry as title holders if they did not qualify for the 2002–03 UEFA Champions League or UEFA Cup through their domestic performance. However, this additional entry was not necessary for this season since the title holders (Feyenoord) qualified for European competitions through their domestic performance.

Association ranking
For the 2002–03 UEFA Cup, the associations were allocated places according to their 2001 UEFA country coefficients, which took into account their performance in European competitions from 1996–97 to 2000–01.

Apart from the allocation based on the country coefficients, associations had additional teams participating in the UEFA Cup, as noted below:
 – Additional berth via Fair Play ranking (Norway, England, Czech Republic)
 – Additional teams transferred from the Champions League
 – Additional teams qualified from the Intertoto Cup

Distribution
Since the title holders (Feyenoord) qualified for the Champions League through their domestic performance, the first round spot reserved for the title holders was vacated, and the following changes to the default allocation system were made:
The domestic cup winners of associations 17 (Switzerland) and 18 (Croatia) were promoted from the qualifying round to the first round.

Redistribution rules
A UEFA Cup place is vacated when a team qualifies for both the Champions League and the UEFA Cup, or qualifies for the UEFA Cup by more than one method. When a place is vacated, it is redistributed within the national association by the following rules:
When the domestic cup winners (considered as the "highest-placed" qualifier within the national association with the latest starting round) also qualify for the Champions League, their UEFA Cup place is vacated. As a result, either of the following teams qualify for the UEFA Cup:
The domestic cup runners-up, provided they have not yet qualified for European competitions, qualify for the UEFA Cup as the "lowest-placed" qualifier (with the earliest starting round), with the other UEFA Cup qualifiers moved up one "place".
Otherwise, the highest-placed team in the league which have not yet qualified for European competitions qualify for the UEFA Cup, with the UEFA Cup qualifiers that finish above them in the league, moved up one "place".
When the domestic cup winners also qualify for the UEFA Cup through league position, their place through the league position is vacated. As a result, the highest-placed team in the league which have not yet qualified for European competitions qualify for the UEFA Cup, with the UEFA Cup qualifiers that finish above them in the league moved up one "place" if possible.
For associations where a UEFA Cup place is reserved for the League Cup winners, they always qualify for the UEFA Cup as the "lowest-placed" qualifier (or as the second "lowest-placed" qualifier in cases where the cup runners-up qualify as stated above). If the League Cup winners have already qualified for European competitions through other methods, this reserved UEFA Cup place is taken by the highest-placed league team in the league which have not yet qualified for European competitions.
A Fair Play place is taken by the highest-ranked team in the domestic Fair Play table which have not yet qualified for European competitions.

Teams
The labels in the parentheses show how each team qualified for the place of its starting round:
TH: Title holders
CW: Cup winners
CR: Cup runners-up
LC: League Cup winners
1st, 2nd, 3rd, 4th, 5th, 6th, etc.: League position
FP: Fair Play
IC: UEFA Intertoto Cup winners
CL: Transferred from the Champions League
GS1: Third-placed teams from the first group stage
Q3: Losers from the third qualifying round

Notes

Round and draw dates
The schedule of the competition was as follows (all draws held at UEFA headquarters in Nyon, Switzerland, unless stated otherwise).

Qualifying round

In the qualifying round, teams were divided into seeded and unseeded teams based on their 2002 UEFA club coefficients, and then drawn into two-legged home-and-away ties. Teams from the same association could not be drawn against each other.

The draw was held on 21 June 2002 in Geneva, Switzerland. The first leg was played on 13 and 15 August, and the second leg was played on 29 August 2002.

|}

First round

As in the previous round, teams were divided into seeded and unseeded teams, based on their UEFA club coefficients, and drawn into two-legged home-and-away ties. Teams from the same association could not be drawn against each other.

The draw was held on 30 August 2002 in Monaco. The first leg was played on 17 and 19 September, and the second leg was played on 1 and 3 October 2002.

|}
1This match was played in front of an empty stadium as punishment to Partizan for earlier crowd trouble.

Second round

As in the previous rounds, teams were divided into seeded and unseeded teams, based on their UEFA club coefficients, and drawn into two-legged home-and-away ties. Teams from the same association could not be drawn against each other.

The draw was held on 8 October 2002 in Nyon, Switzerland. The first leg was played on 29 and 31 October, and the second leg was played on 7, 12 and 14 November 2002.

|}

Final phase

In the final phase, teams played against each other over two legs on a home-and-away basis, except for the one-match final. The mechanism of the draws for each round was as follows:
In the draws for the third and fourth rounds, teams were seeded and divided into groups containing an equal number of seeded and unseeded teams. In each group, the seeded teams were drawn against the unseeded teams, with the first team drawn hosting the first leg. Teams from the same association could not be drawn against each other.
In the draws for the quarter-finals onwards, there were no seedings and teams from the same association could be drawn against each other.

Bracket

Third round
The draw was held on 15 November 2002 in Geneva, Switzerland. The first leg was played on 26 and 28 November, and the second leg was played on 10 and 12 December 2002.

Fourth round
The draw for the fourth round and quarter-finals was held on 13 December 2002. The first leg was played on 20 February, and the second leg was played on 27 February 2003.

Quarter-finals
The first leg was played on 13 March, and the second leg was played on 20 March 2003.

Semi-finals
The draw for the semi-finals and final (to determine the "home" team for administrative purposes) was held on 21 March 2003. The first leg was played on 10 April, and the second leg was played on 24 April 2003.

Final

Top goalscorers

See also
2002–03 UEFA Champions League
2003 UEFA Super Cup

References

External links

2002–03 UEFA Cup at UEFA
2002–03 UEFA Cup at RSSSF

 
2002–03 in European football
2002-03